Gwon Gyeong-min (born 3 January 1982) is a South Korean diver. He competed at the 1996 Summer Olympics and the 2000 Summer Olympics.

References

1982 births
Living people
South Korean male divers
Olympic divers of South Korea
Divers at the 1996 Summer Olympics
Divers at the 2000 Summer Olympics
Place of birth missing (living people)
Asian Games medalists in diving
Divers at the 1998 Asian Games
Divers at the 2002 Asian Games
Divers at the 2006 Asian Games
Asian Games silver medalists for South Korea
Asian Games bronze medalists for South Korea
Medalists at the 2002 Asian Games
Medalists at the 2006 Asian Games
21st-century South Korean people